Alex Giorgetti (born 24 December 1987) is an Italian water polo forward. He won the world title in 2011 and an Olympic silver medal in 2012.

See also
 List of Olympic medalists in water polo (men)
 List of world champions in men's water polo
 List of World Aquatics Championships medalists in water polo

References

External links

 
 

1987 births
Living people
Hungarian people of Italian descent
Sportspeople from Budapest
Italian male water polo players
Water polo drivers
Water polo players at the 2012 Summer Olympics
Medalists at the 2012 Summer Olympics
Olympic silver medalists for Italy in water polo
World Aquatics Championships medalists in water polo
Competitors at the 2013 Mediterranean Games
Mediterranean Games competitors for Italy